Agam Regency is a regency of West Sumatra, Indonesia. It has an area of 2,264.89 km2 and had a population of 454,853 at the 2010 census and 529,138 at the 2020 census. The regency seat is the town of Lubuk Basung. Bukittinggi city is surrounded by this regency but is not administratively included in it.

Lake Maninjau, a crater lake, is a well-known landmark of the regency, and is used as a site for paragliding. This lake is also a primary tourist destination in West Sumatra.

History

This regency was founded to include a collection of several villages that existed in the region of Luhak Agam, during the rule of the Dutch East Indies. Bukittinggi was named as the regency capital at that time. After Bukittinggi was created as an independent city outside of the regency, based on Government Regulation No. 8 of 1998, on 7 January 1998, the Agam Regency's capital was officially moved to Lubuk Basung.

Geography
Astronomically this regency located between 00°01’ 34” – 00°28’ 43” S dan 99°46’ 39” – 100°32’ 50” E. Located in the mountainous region which is formed from 2 lanes Basin, Batang Agam in the north and Batang Sri Antokan in the south.

West area is flat to gently sloping (0-8%), reaching 71,956 ha, while the central and eastern regions which are wavy and hilly to very steep slopes (> 45%) with a total area of 129,352 ha. Regions with a very steep slope (> 45%) are at the Bukit Barisan range with the summit of Mount Merapi with a height of 2,891 meters, and Mount Singgalang with a height of 2,877 meters, in the south and southeast of Agam.

Also, in this region there is Lake Maninjau, a crater lake which has an area of 9,950 ha.

There is Sianok Canyon, a steep valley (ravine) located in the border of Bukittinggi and IV Koto subdistrict. The valley is long and winding as the southern border town of Koto Gadang canyon to the village Sianok Anam Tribe, and ended in the subdistrict Palupuh. The scenery of Sianok canyon also became one of the mainstays of the provincial tourist attraction.

The regency shares land borders with Pasaman and West Pasaman to the north, Padang Pariaman and Tanah Datar to the south, Lima Puluh Kota to the east. It has a sea border with Indian Ocean to the west.

Climate
Temperature consists of two kinds, low-lying areas with a minimum temperature of 25 °C and 33 °C maximum (in Lubuk Basung), whereas in the high areas of minimum 20 °C and maximum 29 °C (in Tilatang Kamang). Average humidity is 88%, wind speed between 4–20 km/hour and the average sun shines 58%.

Administrative districts 
Agam Regency is divided into sixteen districts (kecamatan), tabulated below with their areas and their populations at the 2010 census  and the 2020 census. The table also includes the location of the district administrative centres, the number of administrative villages (rural desa and urban kelurahan) in each district, and its post code.

Note: (a) includes 2 offshore islands.

Each district is sub-divided into several administrative villages. There are 82 villages (nagari in Minangkabau term).

Demography

The Agam Regency is populated mainly by the Minangkabau people, while other ethnic groups include Javanese and Batak.

Economy
Economic growth is dominated by agricultural sector, accounted for 40.40% of GDP, followed by trade, hotels and restaurants by 15.30%, service sector 13.25%, and manufacturing industry 11.71%. Income per capita in 2008 is about Rp 12,000,000 or US$1,333.

Tourism

The development of tourism in Agam regency are generally divided into three regions:

1. West Region, focus on sea and coastal tourism, such as: fishery, recreational beaches and islands, diving/snorkeling, marine resources and marine culture, culinary tourism

2. Central Region, Lake Maninjau is dominant tourist destination in this region. Attraction is paragliding, off-road, racing river craft and others. There is nature tourism, in lake and mountain. Also cultural and history tourism such as Buya Hamka birth house.

3. Eastern region, focus on agrotourism such as fruits and cocoa plantation.

Villages
 

Lambah

References

External links 

 Kabupaten Agam - Agam Regency Government 

Regencies of West Sumatra